Alexandra “Sasha” Emilianov (born 19 September 1999) is a Moldovan female discus thrower, who won an individual gold medal at the 2015 Youth World Championships and at the 2018 IAAF World U20 Championships.

References

External links

1999 births
Living people
Moldovan female discus throwers
World Athletics U20 Championships winners
Kansas Jayhawks women's track and field athletes
Athletes (track and field) at the 2020 Summer Olympics
Olympic athletes of Moldova
20th-century Moldovan women
21st-century Moldovan women